Yaazhnila (யாழ்நிலா) is a feminine name of Tamil origin. Yaal (யாழ்) means "melodious" / "musical", and Nila (நிலா) means "beauty"/"moon". A person with this name is usually a native Tamil. Yaal (யாழ்) is also an ancient Tamil classical music instrument and Nila (நிலா) also refers to the moon.

References

Tamil names

ml:യാഴ്